Melanorhinus is a genus of Neotropical silversides (fish) from the Caribbean Sea and Bahamas.

Species
There are currently three recognized species in this genus:
 Melanorhinus boekei Metzelaar, 1919 (St. Maarten pejerry)
 Melanorhinus cyanellus (Meek & Hildebrand, 1923) (Blackback silverside)
 Melanorhinus microps (Poey, 1860) (Querimana silverside)

References

Atherinopsidae